Glenside Memorial Hall often abbreviated "Glenside Hall" is a historic meeting hall located in the Philadelphia suburb of Glenside, Cheltenham Township, Montgomery County, Pennsylvania. Glenside Hall was built in 1926, and is a -story, T-shaped, red-brick Colonial Revival-style building with limestone trim. It sits on a raised stone foundation and has a slate-covered gable roof. It was to honor the veterans of World War I. Today, it is used primarily for banquets, meetings, and other social events.

It was added to the National Register of Historic Places in 2004.

References

Clubhouses on the National Register of Historic Places in Pennsylvania
Colonial Revival architecture in Pennsylvania
Buildings and structures completed in 1926
Buildings and structures in Montgomery County, Pennsylvania
Cheltenham Township, Pennsylvania
National Register of Historic Places in Montgomery County, Pennsylvania